The Count of Monte Cristo is a 1961 French-Italian film version of Alexandre Dumas' 1844 novel directed by Claude Autant-Lara.

Cast
 Louis Jourdan: Edmond Dantes
 Yvonne Furneaux: Mercedes
 Pierre Mondy: Caderousse
 Bernard Dhéran: Villefort
 Franco Silva: Mario
 Claudine Coster: Haydée
 Jean-Claude Michel: Fernand de Morcerf
 Yves Rénier: Albert de Mortcerf
 Roldano Lupi: Morel
 Marie Mergey: Madame Caderousse
 Jean Martinelli: Vidocq
 Henri Guisol: L'abbé Faria

Reception
The film was the seventh most popular film at the French box office in 1961. The sixth most popular was a version of The Three Musketeers.

References

External links
 
 The Count of Monte Cristo at Variety Distribution

1961 films
Films based on The Count of Monte Cristo
Films directed by Claude Autant-Lara
1960s French-language films
1960s historical films
French historical films
1960s French films